"Number One Spot" is the second single from rapper Ludacris' 2004 album The Red Light District. The song heavily samples "Soul Bossa Nova" by Quincy Jones, which was used as the theme tune of the Mike Myers James Bond parody film series Austin Powers; the films references play a major part in "Number One Spot" and its video.

In the song's first verse, Ludacris says, "Respected highly, hi, Mr. O'Reilly/Hope all is well, kiss the plaintiff and the wifey." This line is a response to commentator Bill O'Reilly's criticism of Pepsi for featuring Ludacris in a 2002 commercial; it is a reference to a 2004 sexual harassment lawsuit brought against O'Reilly by a former employee.

The song reached #19 on the US Billboard Hot 100 chart and #30 in UK. "Number One Spot" was nominated for Best Rap Solo Performance at the Grammy Awards of 2006, but it lost to Kanye West's "Gold Digger".
 
A remix to the song features Kardinal Offishall.

Music video
The music video features spoofs of scenes from the Austin Powers films, with Ludacris taking the roles of Austin Powers, Fat Bastard, Goldmember and Dr. Evil. The video also features LisaRaye and Verne Troyer, who plays Mini-Me in the film franchise. Quincy Jones and Slick Rick also make appearances in the music video. The subsequent single entitled "The Potion" was the conclusion to the music video (lasting approximately 45 seconds). The video won the MTV Video Music Award for Best Rap Video in 2005.

Track listing
 CD Single
 "Number One Spot" (clean version) – 4:34
 "Number One Spot" (explicit version) – 4:34

 12" single
 "Number One Spot" (explicit version) – 4:34
 "The Potion" (explicit version) – 3:54
 "Get Back" (explicit version) – 4:30
 "Get Back" (Sum 41 rock remix) – 4:11

Charts

Weekly charts

Year-end charts

Certifications

References

External links
 

2004 songs
2005 singles
Ludacris songs
Def Jam Recordings singles
Songs written by Ludacris
Songs written by Quincy Jones